María Florentina Ocegueda Silva (born 6 March 1961) is a Mexican politician from the Party of the Democratic Revolution. In 2012 she served as Deputy of the LXI Legislature of the Mexican Congress representing Nayarit.

References

1961 births
Living people
Politicians from Nayarit
Women members of the Chamber of Deputies (Mexico)
Party of the Democratic Revolution politicians
21st-century Mexican politicians
21st-century Mexican women politicians
Deputies of the LXI Legislature of Mexico
Members of the Chamber of Deputies (Mexico) for Nayarit